Paul Leroy Robeson (April 9, 1898 – January 23, 1976) was an American bass-baritone concert artist, stage and film actor, professional football player, and activist who became famous both for his cultural accomplishments and for his political stances.

In 1915, Robeson won an academic scholarship to Rutgers College. While at Rutgers, he was twice named a consensus All-American in football and was the class valedictorian. He received his LL.B. from Columbia Law School while playing in the National Football League (NFL). After graduation, he became a figure in the Harlem Renaissance with performances in The Emperor Jones and All God's Chillun Got Wings.

Robeson performed in Britain in a touring melodrama, Voodoo, in 1922, and in Emperor Jones in 1925. In 1928, he scored a major success in the London premiere of Show Boat. Living in London for several years with his wife Eslanda, Robeson continued to establish himself as a concert artist and starred in a London production of Othello, the first of three productions of the play over the course of his career. He also gained attention in Sanders of the River (1935) and in the film production of Show Boat (1936). Robeson's political activities began with his involvement with unemployed workers and anti-imperialist students in Britain, and it continued with his support for the Republican cause during the Spanish Civil War and his involvement in the Council on African Affairs (CAA).

After returning to the United States in 1939, Robeson supported the American and Allied war efforts during World War II. However, his history of supporting civil rights causes and Soviet policies brought scrutiny from the FBI. After the war ended, the CAA was placed on the Attorney General's List of Subversive Organizations. Robeson was investigated during the McCarthy era. Due to his decision not to recant his public advocacy, he was denied a passport by the U.S. State Department; his income, consequently, plummeted. He moved to Harlem and published a periodical called Freedom, which was critical of United States policies, from 1950 to 1955. Robeson's right to travel was eventually restored as a result of the 1958 United States Supreme Court decision Kent v. Dulles.

Between 1925 and 1961, Robeson recorded and released some 276 songs. The first of these were the spirituals "Steal Away" (backed with "Were You There") in 1925. Robeson's recorded repertoire spanned many styles, including Americana, popular standards, classical music, European folk songs, political songs, poetry and spoken excerpts from plays.

Early life

1898–1915: Childhood

Robeson was born in Princeton, New Jersey, in 1898, to Reverend William Drew Robeson and Maria Louisa Bustill. His mother, Maria, was a member of the Bustills, a prominent Quaker family of mixed ancestry. His father, William, was of Igbo origin and was born into slavery.  William escaped from a plantation in his teens and eventually became the minister of Princeton's Witherspoon Street Presbyterian Church in 1881. Robeson had three brothers: William Drew Jr. (born 1881), Reeve (born c. 1887), and Ben (born c. 1893); and one sister, Marian (born c. 1895).

In 1900, a disagreement between William and white financial supporters of the Witherspoon church arose with apparent racial undertones, which were prevalent in Princeton. William, who had the support of his entirely black congregation, resigned in 1901. The loss of his position forced him to work menial jobs. Three years later when Robeson was six, his mother, who was nearly blind, died in a house fire. Eventually, William became financially incapable of providing a house for himself and his children still living at home, Ben and Paul, so they moved into the attic of a store in Westfield, New Jersey.

William found a stable parsonage at the St. Thomas A.M.E. Zion in 1910, where Robeson filled in for his father during sermons when he was called away. In 1912, Robeson began attending Somerville High School in New Jersey, where he performed in Julius Caesar and Othello, sang in the chorus, and excelled in football, basketball, baseball and track. His athletic dominance elicited racial taunts which he ignored. Prior to his graduation, he won a statewide academic contest for a scholarship to Rutgers and was named class valedictorian. He took a summer job as a waiter in Narragansett Pier, Rhode Island, where he befriended Fritz Pollard, later to be the first African-American coach in the National Football League.

1915–1919: Rutgers College

In late 1915, Robeson became the third African-American student ever enrolled at Rutgers, and the only one at the time. He tried out for the Rutgers Scarlet Knights football team, and his resolve to make the squad was tested as his teammates engaged in excessive play, during which his nose was broken and his shoulder dislocated. The coach, Foster Sanford, decided he had overcome the provocation and announced that he had made the team.

Robeson joined the debating team and sang off-campus for spending money, and on-campus with the Glee Club informally, as membership required attending all-white mixers. He also joined the other collegiate athletic teams. As a sophomore, amidst Rutgers' sesquicentennial celebration, he was benched when a Southern football team, Washington and Lee University,  refused to take the field because the Scarlet Knights had fielded a Negro, Robeson.

After a standout junior year of football, he was recognized in The Crisis for his athletic, academic, and singing talents. At this time his father fell grievously ill. Robeson took the sole responsibility in caring for him, shuttling between Rutgers and Somerville. His father, who was the "glory of his boyhood years" soon died, and at Rutgers, Robeson expounded on the incongruity of African Americans fighting to protect America in World War I but not having the same opportunities in the United States as whites.

He finished university with four annual oratorical triumphs and varsity letters in multiple sports. His play at end won him first-team All-American selection, in both his junior and senior years. Walter Camp considered him the greatest end ever. Academically, he was accepted into Phi Beta Kappa and Cap and Skull. His classmates recognized him by electing him class valedictorian. The Daily Targum published a poem featuring his achievements. In his valedictory speech, he exhorted his classmates to work for equality for all Americans. At Rutgers Robeson also gained a reputation for his singing, having a deep rich voice which some saw as bass with a high range, others as baritone with low notes. Throughout his career Robeson was classified as a bass-baritone.

1919–1923: Columbia Law School and marriage
Robeson entered New York University School of Law in fall 1919. To support himself, he became an assistant football coach at Lincoln University, where he joined the Alpha Phi Alpha. However, Robeson felt uncomfortable at NYU and moved to Harlem and transferred to Columbia Law School in February 1920. Already known in the black community for his singing, he was selected to perform at the dedication of the Harlem YWCA.

Robeson began dating Eslanda "Essie" Goode and after her coaxing, he gave his theatrical debut as Simon in Ridgely Torrence's Simon of Cyrene. After a year of courtship, they were married in August 1921.

Robeson was recruited by Fritz Pollard to play for the NFL's Akron Pros while he continued his law studies. In the spring of 1922, Robeson postponed school to portray Jim in Mary Hoyt Wiborg's play Taboo. He then sang in the chorus of an Off-Broadway production of Shuffle Along before he joined Taboo in Britain. The play was adapted by Mrs. Patrick Campbell to highlight his singing. After the play's run ended, he befriended Lawrence Brown, a classically trained musician, before returning to Columbia while playing for the NFL's Milwaukee Badgers. He ended his football career after the 1922 season, and graduated from Columbia Law School in 1923.

Theatrical success and ideological transformation

1923–1927: Harlem Renaissance
Robeson worked briefly as a lawyer, but he renounced a career in law because of racism. His wife supported them financially. She was the head histological chemist in Surgical Pathology at New York-Presbyterian Hospital. She continued to work there until 1925 when his career took off.  They frequented the social functions at the future Schomburg Center. In December 1924 he landed the lead role of Jim in Eugene O'Neill's All God's Chillun Got Wings, which culminated with Jim metaphorically consummating his marriage with his white wife by symbolically emasculating himself. Chillun's opening was postponed due to nationwide controversy over its plot.

Chillun's delay led to a revival of The Emperor Jones with Robeson as Brutus, a role pioneered by Charles Sidney Gilpin. The role terrified and galvanized Robeson, as it was practically a 90-minute soliloquy. Reviews declared him an unequivocal success. Though arguably clouded by its controversial subject, his Jim in Chillun was less well received. He answered criticism of its plot by writing that fate had drawn him to the "untrodden path" of drama, that the true measure of a culture is in its artistic contributions, and that the only true American culture was African-American.

The success of his acting placed him in elite social circles and his ascension to fame, which was forcefully aided by Essie, had occurred at a startling pace. Essie's ambition for Robeson was a startling dichotomy to his indifference. She quit her job, became his agent, and negotiated his first movie role in a silent race film directed by Oscar Micheaux, Body and Soul (1925). To support a charity for single mothers, he headlined a concert singing spirituals. He performed his repertoire of spirituals on the radio.

Lawrence Brown, who had become renowned while touring as a pianist with gospel singer Roland Hayes, chanced upon Robeson in Harlem. The two ad-libbed a set of spirituals, with Robeson as lead and Brown as accompanist. This so enthralled them that they booked Provincetown Playhouse for a concert. The pair's rendition of African-American folk songs and spirituals was captivating, and Victor Records signed Robeson to a contract in September 1925.

The Robesons went to London for a revival of The Emperor Jones, before spending the rest of the fall on holiday on the French Riviera, socializing with Gertrude Stein and Claude McKay. Robeson and Brown performed a series of concert tours in America from January 1926 until May 1927.

During a hiatus in New York, Robeson learned that Essie was several months pregnant. Paul Robeson Jr. was born in November 1927 in New York, while Robeson and Brown toured Europe. Essie experienced complications from the birth, and by mid-December, her health had deteriorated dramatically. Ignoring Essie's objections, her mother wired Robeson and he immediately returned to her bedside. Essie completely recovered after a few months.

1928–1932: Show Boat, Othello, and marriage difficulties
In 1928, Robeson played "Joe" in the London production of the American musical Show Boat, at the Theatre Royal, Drury Lane. His rendition of "Ol' Man River" became the benchmark for all future performers of the song. Some black critics were not pleased with the play due to its usage of the word "nigger". It was, nonetheless, immensely popular with white audiences. He was summoned for a Royal Command Performance at Buckingham Palace and Robeson was befriended by Members of Parliament (MPs) from the House of Commons. Show Boat continued for 350 performances and, as of 2001, it remained the Royal's most profitable venture. The Robesons bought a home in Hampstead. He reflected on his life in his diary and wrote that it was all part of a "higher plan" and "God watches over me and guides me. He's with me and lets me fight my own battles and hopes I'll win." However, an incident at the Savoy Grill, in which he was refused seating, sparked him to issue a press release describing the insult which subsequently became a matter of public debate.

Essie had learned early in their marriage that Robeson had been involved in extramarital affairs, but she tolerated them. However, when she discovered that he was having another affair, she unfavorably altered the characterization of him in his biography, and defamed him by describing him with "negative racial stereotypes". Despite her uncovering of this tryst, there was no public evidence that their relationship had soured.

The couple appeared in the experimental Swiss film Borderline (1930). He then returned to the Savoy Theatre, in London's West End to play Othello, opposite Peggy Ashcroft as Desdemona. He cited the lack of a "racial problem" in London as significant in his decision to move to London. Robeson was the first black actor to play Othello in Britain since Ira Aldridge. The production received mixed reviews which noted Robeson's "highly civilized quality [but lacking the] grand style." Robeson stated the best way to diminish the oppression African Americans faced was for his artistic work to be an example of what "men of my colour" could accomplish rather than to "be a propagandist and make speeches and write articles about what they call the Colour Question."

After Essie discovered Robeson had been having an affair with Ashcroft, she decided to seek a divorce and they split up. While working in London, Robeson became one of the first artists to record at the new EMI Recording Studios (later known as Abbey Road Studios), recording four songs in September 1931, almost two months before the studio was officially opened. Robeson returned to Broadway as Joe in the 1932 revival of Show Boat, to critical and popular acclaim. Subsequently, he received, with immense pride, an honorary master's degree from Rutgers. Thereabout, his former football coach, Foster Sanford, advised him that divorcing Essie and marrying Ashcroft would do irreparable damage to his reputation. Ashcroft and Robeson's relationship ended in 1932, following which Robeson and Essie reconciled, although their relationship was scarred permanently.

1933–1937: Ideological awakening
In 1933, Robeson played the role of Jim in the London production of Chillun, virtually gratis, then returned to the United States to star as Brutus in the film The Emperor Jones—the first film to feature an African American in a starring role, "a feat not repeated for more than two decades in the U.S." His acting in The Emperor Jones was well received. On the film set he rejected any slight to his dignity, despite the widespread Jim Crow atmosphere in the United States. Upon returning to England, he publicly criticized African Americans' rejection of their own culture. Despite negative reactions from the press, such as a New York Amsterdam News retort that Robeson had made a "jolly well [ass of himself]", he also announced that he would reject any offers to perform central European (though not Russian, which he considered "Asiatic") opera because the music had no connection to his heritage.

In early 1934, Robeson enrolled in the School of Oriental and African Studies (SOAS), a constituent college of the University of London, where he studied phonetics and Swahili. His "sudden interest" in African history and its influence on culture coincided with his essay "I Want to be African", wherein he wrote of his desire to embrace his ancestry.

His friends in the anti-imperialist movement and his association with British socialists led him to visit the Soviet Union. Robeson, Essie, and Marie Seton traveled to the Soviet Union on an invitation from Sergei Eisenstein in December 1934. A stopover in Berlin enlightened Robeson to the racism in Nazi Germany and, on his arrival in Moscow, in the Soviet Union, Robeson said, "Here I am not a Negro but a human being for the first time in my life ... I walk in full human dignity."

He undertook the role of Bosambo in the movie Sanders of the River (1935), which he felt would render a realistic view of colonial African culture. Sanders of the River made Robeson an international movie star; but the stereotypical portrayal of a colonial African was seen as embarrassing to his stature as an artist and damaging to his reputation. The Commissioner of Nigeria to London protested the film as slanderous to his country, and Robeson thereafter became more politically conscious of his roles. He appeared in the play Stevedore at the Embassy Theatre in London in May 1935, which was favorably reviewed in The Crisis by Nancy Cunard, who concluded: "Stevedore is extremely valuable in the racial–social question—it is straight from the shoulder". In early 1936, he decided to send his son to school in the Soviet Union to shield him from racist attitudes. He then played the role of Toussaint L'Ouverture in the eponymous play by C.L.R. James at the Westminster Theatre, and appeared in the films Song of Freedom, and Show Boat in 1936, and My Song Goes Forth,  King Solomon's Mines. and Big Fella, all in 1937. In 1938, he was named by American Motion Picture Herald as the 10th most popular star in British cinema.

 In 1935 Robeson met Albert Einstein when Einstein came backstage after Robeson's concert at the McCarter Theatre. The two discovered that, as well as a mutual passion for music, they shared a hatred for fascism. The friendship between Robeson and Einstein lasted nearly twenty years, but was not well known or publicised.

1937–1939: Spanish Civil War and political activism
Robeson believed that the struggle against fascism during the Spanish Civil War was a turning point in his life and transformed him into a political activist. In 1937, he used his concert performances to advocate the Republican cause and the war's refugees. He permanently modified his renditions of "Ol' Man River" – initially, by singing the word "darkies" instead of "niggers"; later, by changing some of the stereotypical dialect in the lyrics to standard English and replacing the fatalistic last verse ("Ah gits weary / An' sick of tryin' / Ah'm tired of livin' / An skeered of dyin) with an uplifting verse of his own ("But I keep laffin' / Instead of cryin' / I must keep fightin' / Until I'm dyin) – transforming it from a tragic "song of resignation with a hint of protest implied" into a battle hymn of unwavering defiance. His business agent expressed concern about his political involvement, but Robeson overruled him and decided that contemporary events trumped commercialism. In Wales, he commemorated the Welsh people killed while fighting for the Republicans, where he recorded a message that became his epitaph: "The artist must take sides. He must elect to fight for freedom or slavery. I have made my choice. I had no alternative."

After an invitation from J. B. S. Haldane, he traveled to Spain in 1938 because he believed in the International Brigades's cause, visited the hospital of the Benicàssim, singing to the wounded soldiers. Robeson also visited the battlefront and provided a morale boost to the Republicans at a time when their victory was unlikely. Back in England, he hosted Jawaharlal Nehru to support Indian independence, whereat Nehru expounded on imperialism's affiliation with Fascism. Robeson reevaluated the direction of his career and decided to focus on the ordeals of "common people". He appeared in the pro-labor play Plant in the Sun, in which he played an Irishman, his first "white" role. With Max Yergan, and the International Committee on African Affairs (later known as the Council on African Affairs or CAA), Robeson became an advocate for African nationalism and political independence.

Paul Robeson was living in Britain until shortly before the start of the Second World War in 1939. His name was included in the Sonderfahndungsliste G.B. as a target for arrest if Germany had occupied Britain.

World War II, the Broadway Othello, political activism, and McCarthyism

1939–1945: World War II, and the Broadway Othello 

Robeson's last British film was The Proud Valley (1940), set in a Welsh coal-mining town. Shortly after the outbreak of World War II, Robeson and his family returned to the United States in 1940, to Enfield, Connecticut, and he became America's "no.1 entertainer" with a radio broadcast of Ballad for Americans. Nevertheless, during a tour in 1940, the Beverly Wilshire Hotel was the only major Los Angeles hotel willing to accommodate him due to his race, at an exorbitant rate and registered under an assumed name, and he therefore dedicated two hours every afternoon to sitting in the lobby, where he was widely recognised, "to ensure that the next time Black come through, they'll have a place to stay." Los Angeles hotels lifted their restrictions on black guests soon afterwards.

Robeson narrated the 1942 documentary Native Land which was labeled by the FBI as communist propaganda. After an appearance in Tales of Manhattan (1942), a production which he felt was "very offensive to my people", he announced that he would no longer act in films because of the demeaning roles available to blacks. (See Tales of Manhattan#Controversy surrounding fifth tale upon 1942 release).

According to democratic socialist writer Barry Finger's critical appraisal of Robeson, while the Hitler-Stalin pact was still in effect, Robeson counseled American blacks that they had no stake in the rivalry of European powers. Once Russia was attacked, he urged blacks to support the war effort, now warning that an Allied defeat would "make slaves of us all. Robeson participated in benefit concerts on behalf of the war effort and at a concert at the Polo Grounds, he met two emissaries from the Jewish Anti-Fascist Committee, Solomon Mikhoels and Itzik Feffer Subsequently, Robeson reprised his role of Othello at the Shubert Theatre in 1943, and became the first African American to play the role with a white supporting cast on Broadway. During the same period, he addressed a meeting with Commissioner Kenesaw Mountain Landis and team owners in a failed attempt to convince them to admit black players to Major League Baseball. He toured North America with Othello until 1945, and subsequently, his political efforts with the CAA to get colonial powers to discontinue their exploitation of Africa were short-circuited by the United Nations.

During this period, Robeson also developed a sympathy for Republic of China's side in the Second Sino-Japanese War. In 1940, the Chinese progressive activist, Liu Liangmo taught Robeson the patriotic song "Chee Lai!" ("Arise!"), known as the March of the Volunteers. Robeson premiered the song at a concert in New York City's Lewisohn Stadium and recorded it in both English and Chinese for Keynote Records in early 1941. Robeson gave further performances at benefit concerts for the China Aid Council and United China Relief at Washington's Uline Arena on April 24, 1941. The Washington Committee for Aid to China's booking of Constitution Hall had been blocked by the Daughters of the American Revolution owing to Robeson's race. The indignation was so great that Eleanor Roosevelt and Hu Shih, the Chinese ambassador, became sponsors. However, when the organizers offered tickets on generous terms to the National Negro Congress to help fill the larger venue, both sponsors withdrew, objecting to the NNC's Communist ties.

The song became newly founded People's Republic of China's National Anthem after 1949. Its Chinese lyricist, Tian Han, died in a Beijing prison in 1968, but Robeson continued to send royalties to his family.

1946–1949: Attorney General's List of Subversive Organizations
After the Moore's Ford lynchings of four African Americans in Georgia on July 25, 1946, Robeson met with President Truman and admonished Truman by stating that if he did not enact legislation to end lynching, "the Negroes will defend themselves". Truman immediately terminated the meeting and declared that the time was not right to propose anti-lynching legislation. Subsequently, Robeson publicly called upon all Americans to demand that Congress pass civil rights legislation. Robeson founded the American Crusade Against Lynching organization in 1946. This organization was thought to be a threat to the NAACP antiviolence movement. Robeson received support from W. E. B. Du Bois on this matter and launched the organization on the anniversary of the signing of the Emancipation Proclamation, September 23.

About this time, Robeson's belief that trade unionism was crucial to civil rights became a mainstay of his political beliefs as he became a proponent of the union activist and Communist Party USA member Revels Cayton. Robeson was later called before the Tenney Committee where he responded to questions about his affiliation with the Communist Party USA (CPUSA) by testifying that he was not a member of the CPUSA. Nevertheless, two organizations with which Robeson was intimately involved, the Civil Rights Congress (CRC) and the CAA, were placed on the Attorney General's List of Subversive Organizations (AGLOSO). Subsequently, he was summoned before the United States Senate Committee on the Judiciary, and when questioned about his affiliation with the Communist Party, he refused to answer, stating: "Some of the most brilliant and distinguished Americans are about to go to jail for the failure to answer that question, and I am going to join them, if necessary."

In 1948, Robeson was prominent in Henry A. Wallace's bid for the President of the United States, during which Robeson traveled to the Deep South, at risk to his own life, to campaign for him. In the ensuing year, Robeson was forced to go overseas to work because his concert performances were canceled at the FBI's behest. While on tour, he spoke at the World Peace Council, at which his speech was publicly reported as equating America with a Fascist state—a depiction that he flatly denied. Nevertheless, the speech publicly attributed to him was a catalyst for his being seen as an enemy of mainstream America. Robeson refused to bow to public criticism when he advocated in favor of twelve defendants, including his long-time friend, Benjamin J. Davis Jr., charged during the Smith Act trials of Communist Party leaders.

Robeson traveled to Moscow in June 1949, and tried to find Itzik Feffer whom he had met during World War II. He let Soviet authorities know that he wanted to see him. Reluctant to lose Robeson as a propagandist for the Soviet Union, the Soviets brought Feffer from prison to him. Feffer told him that Mikhoels had been murdered, and he would be summarily executed. To protect the Soviet Union's reputation, and to keep the right wing of the United States from gaining the moral high ground, Robeson denied that any persecution existed in the Soviet Union, and kept the meeting secret for the rest of his life, except from his son. On June 20, 1949, Robeson spoke at the Paris Peace Congress saying that "We in America do not forget that it was on the backs of the white workers from Europe and on the backs of millions of Blacks that the wealth of America was built.  And we are resolved to share it equally.  We reject any hysterical raving that urges us to make war on anyone.  Our will to fight for peace is strong.  We shall not make war on anyone.  We shall not make war on the Soviet Union.  We oppose those who wish to build up imperialist Germany and to establish fascism in Greece.  We wish peace with Franco's Spain despite her fascism.  We shall support peace and friendship among all nations, with Soviet Russia and the people's Republics." He was blacklisted for saying this in the mainstream press within the United States, including in many periodicals of the Negro press such as The Crisis.

In order to isolate Robeson politically, the House Un-American Activities Committee (HUAC) subpoenaed Jackie Robinson to comment on Robeson's Paris speech. Robinson testified that Robeson's statements, "'if accurately reported', were silly'". Days later, the announcement of a concert headlined by Robeson in New York City provoked the local press to decry the use of their community to support "subversives". The Peekskill Riots ensued in which violent anti-Robeson protests shut down a Robeson concert on August 27, 1949, and marred the aftermath of the replacement concert held eight days later.

1950–1955: Blacklisted
A book reviewed in early 1950 as "the most complete record on college football" failed to list Robeson as ever having played on the Rutgers team and as ever having been an All-American. Months later, NBC canceled Robeson's appearance on Eleanor Roosevelt's television program. Subsequently, the State Department denied Robeson a passport and issued a "stop notice" at all ports. An isolated existence inside United States borders afforded him less freedom to express what some saw as his "extreme advocacy on behalf of the independence of the colonial peoples of Africa." When Robeson met with State Department officials and asked why he was denied a passport, he was told that "his frequent criticism of the treatment of blacks in the United States should not be aired in foreign countries".

In 1950, Robeson co-founded, with W. E. B. Du Bois, a monthly newspaper, Freedom, showcasing his views and those of his circle.  Most issues had a column by Robeson, on the front page.  In the final issue, July–August 1955, an unsigned column on the front page of the newspaper described the struggle for the restoration of his passport.  It called for support from the leading African-American organizations, and asserted that "Negroes, [and] all Americans who have breathed a sigh of relief at the easing of international tensions... have a stake in the Paul Robeson passport case." An article by Robeson appeared on the second page continuing the passport issue under the headline: "If Enough People Write Washington I'll Get My Passport in a Hurry."

In 1951, an article titled "Paul Robeson – the Lost Shepherd" was published in The Crisis and attributed to Robert Alan, although Paul Jr. suspected it was written by Amsterdam News columnist Earl Brown. J. Edgar Hoover and the United States State Department arranged for the article to be printed and distributed in Africa in order to damage Robeson's reputation and reduce his popularity and Communism's popularity in colonial countries. Another article by Roy Wilkins (now thought to have been the real author of "Paul Robeson – the Lost Shepherd") denounced Robeson as well as the Communist Party USA (CPUSA) in terms consistent with the anti-Communist FBI propaganda of the era.

In December 1951, Robeson, in New York City, and William L. Patterson, in Paris, presented the United Nations with a Civil Rights Congress's petition titled "We Charge Genocide". The document asserted that the United States federal government, by its failure to act against lynching in the United States, was "guilty of genocide" under Article II of the UN Genocide Convention. The petition was not officially acknowledged by the UN, and, though receiving some favorable reception in Europe and in America's Black press, was largely either ignored or criticized for its association with Communism in America's mainstream press.

In 1952, Robeson was awarded the International Stalin Prize by the Soviet Union. Unable to travel to Moscow, he accepted the award in New York. In April 1953, shortly after Stalin's death, Robeson penned To You My Beloved Comrade, praising Stalin as dedicated to peace and a guide to the world: "Through his deep humanity, by his wise understanding, he leaves us a rich and monumental heritage." Robeson's opinions about the Soviet Union kept his passport out of reach and stopped his return to the entertainment industry and the civil rights movement. In his opinion, the Soviet Union was the guarantor of political balance in the world.

In a symbolic act of defiance against the travel ban, in May 1952, labor unions in the United States and Canada organized a concert at the International Peace Arch on the border between Washington state and the Canadian province of British Columbia. Robeson returned to perform a second concert at the Peace Arch in 1953, and over the next two years, two further concerts took place. In this period, with the encouragement of his friend the Welsh politician Aneurin Bevan, Robeson recorded a number of radio concerts for supporters in Wales.

1956–1957: End of McCarthyism

In 1956, Robeson was called before HUAC after he refused to sign an affidavit affirming that he was not a Communist. In his testimony, he invoked the Fifth Amendment and refused to reveal his political affiliations. When asked why he had not remained in the Soviet Union because of his affinity with its political ideology, he replied, "because my father was a slave and my people died to build [the United States and], I am going to stay here, and have a part of it just like you and no fascist-minded people will drive me from it!"   At that hearing, Robeson stated "Whether I am or not a Communist is irrelevant. The question is whether American citizens, regardless of their political beliefs or sympathies, may enjoy their constitutional rights."

Due to the reaction to the promulgation of Robeson's political views, his recordings and films were removed from public distribution, and he was universally condemned in the U.S press. During the height of the Cold War, it became increasingly difficult in the United States to hear Robeson sing on commercial radio, buy his music or see his films.

In 1956, in the United Kingdom, Topic Records, at that time part of the Workers Music Association, released a single of Robeson singing the labor anthem "Joe Hill", written by Alfred Hayes and Earl Robinson, backed with "John Brown's Body". In 1956, after public pressure brought a one-time exemption to the travel ban, Robeson performed two concerts in Canada in February, one in Toronto and the other at a union convention in Sudbury, Ontario.

Still unable to perform abroad in person, on May 26, 1957, Robeson sang for a London audience at St. Pancras Town Hall (where the 1,000 available concert tickets for "Let Robeson Sing" sold out within an hour) via the recently completed transatlantic telephone cable TAT-1. In October of that year, using the same technology, Robeson sang to an audience of 5,000 at Porthcawl's Grand Pavilion in Wales.

Nikita Khrushchev's denunciation of Stalinism at the 1956 Party Congress silenced Robeson on Stalin, although Robeson continued to praise the Soviet Union.  That year Robeson, along with close friend W.E.B. Du Bois, compared the anti-Soviet uprising in Hungary to the "same sort of people who overthrew the Spanish Republican Government" and supported the Soviet invasion and suppression of the revolt.

Robeson's passport was finally restored in 1958 as a result of the U.S. Supreme Court's 5 to 4 decision in Kent v. Dulles where the majority ruled that the denial of a passport without due process amounted to a violation of constitutionally protected liberty under the 5th Amendment.

Later years

1958–1960: Comeback tours
1958 saw the publication of Robeson's "manifesto-autobiography" Here I Stand.

Europe
Robeson embarked on a world tour using London as his base. In 1958, he gave 28 performances at towns and cities around the UK (see souvenir programme opposite). In April 1959 he starred in Tony Richardson's production of Othello at Stratford-Upon-Avon. In Moscow in August 1959, he received a tumultuous reception at the Luzhniki Stadium where he sang classic Russian songs along with American standards. Robeson and Essie then flew to Yalta to rest and spend time with Nikita Khrushchev.

On October 11, 1959, Robeson took part in a service at St. Paul's Cathedral, the first black performer to sing there.

On a trip to Moscow, Robeson experienced bouts of dizziness and heart problems and was hospitalized for two months while Essie was diagnosed with operable cancer. He recovered and returned to the UK to visit the National Eisteddfod of Wales.

In 1960, in what was his final concert performance in Great Britain, Robeson sang to raise money for the Movement for Colonial Freedom at the Royal Festival Hall.

Australia and New Zealand
In October 1960, Robeson embarked on a two-month concert tour of Australia and New Zealand with Essie, primarily to generate money, at the behest of Australian politician Bill Morrow. While in Sydney, he became the first major artist to perform at the construction site of the future Sydney Opera House. After appearing at the Brisbane Festival Hall, they went to Auckland where Robeson reaffirmed his support of Marxism-Leninism, denounced the inequality faced by the Māori and efforts to denigrate their culture. Thereabouts, Robeson publicly stated "... the people of the lands of Socialism want peace dearly".

During the tour he was introduced to Faith Bandler and other activists who aroused the Robesons' concern  for the plight of the Australian Aborigines. Robeson subsequently demanded that the Australian government provide the Aborigines citizenship and equal rights. He attacked the view of the Aborigines as being unsophisticated and uncultured, and declared, "there's no such thing as a backward human being, there is only a society which says they are backward."

Robeson left Australia as a respected, albeit controversial, figure and his support for Aboriginal rights had a profound effect in Australia over the next decade.

1961–1963: Health breakdown

Back in London after his Australia and New Zealand tour, Robeson expressed a desire to return to the United States and participate in the civil rights movement, while his wife argued that he would be unsafe there and "unable to make any money" due to
government harassment. In March 1961 Robeson again traveled to Moscow.

Moscow breakdown
During an uncharacteristically wild party in his Moscow hotel room, Robeson locked himself in his bedroom and attempted suicide by cutting his wrists. Three days later, under Soviet medical care, he told his son, who had traveled to Moscow at the news, that he felt extreme paranoia, thought that the walls of the room were moving and, overcome by a powerful sense of emptiness and depression, tried to take his own life.

Paul Jr. has said that his father's health problems stemmed from attempts by the CIA and MI5 to "neutralize" his father. He remembered that his father had had such fears before his prostate operation. He said that three doctors treating Robeson in London and New York had been CIA contractors, and that his father's symptoms resulted from being "subjected to mind de-patterning under MK-ULTRA", a secret CIA programme. Martin Duberman wrote that Robeson's health breakdown was probably brought on by a combination of factors including extreme emotional and physical stress, bipolar depression, exhaustion and the beginning of circulatory and heart problems. "[E]ven without an organic predisposition and accumulated pressures of government harassment he might have been susceptible to a breakdown."

Repeated deterioration in London
Robeson stayed at the Barvikha Sanatorium until September 1961, when he left for London. There his depression reemerged, and after another period of recuperation in Moscow, he returned to London.

Three days after arriving back , he became suicidal and suffered a panic attack while passing the Soviet Embassy. He was admitted to the Priory Hospital, where he underwent electroconvulsive therapy (ECT) and was given heavy doses of drugs for nearly two years, with no accompanying psychotherapy. During his treatment at the Priory, Robeson was being monitored by the British MI5.

Both British and American intelligence services were well aware of Robeson's suicidal state of mind: An FBI memo described Robeson's debilitated condition, remarking that his "death would be much publicized" and would be used for Communist propaganda, necessitating continued surveillance. Numerous memos advised that Robeson should be denied a passport renewal, an obstacle that was likely to further jeopardize his recovery process.

Treatment in East Germany
In August 1963, disturbed about his treatment, friends and family had Robeson transferred to the Buch Clinic in East Berlin. Given psychotherapy and less medication, his physicians found him still "completely without initiative" and they expressed "doubt and anger" about the "high level of barbiturates and ECT" that had been administered in London. He rapidly improved, though his doctor stressed that "what little is left of Paul's health must be quietly conserved."

1963–1976: Retirement

In December 1963, Robeson returned to the United States and for the remainder of his life lived mainly in seclusion.
He momentarily assumed a role in the civil rights movement, making a few major public appearances before falling seriously ill during a tour. Double pneumonia and a kidney blockage in 1965 nearly killed him.

Invitations to civil rights movement
Robeson was contacted by both Bayard Rustin and James Farmer about the possibility of becoming involved with the mainstream of the Civil Rights Movement.

Because of Rustin's past anti-Communist stances, Robeson declined to meet with him. Robeson eventually met with Farmer, but because he was asked to denounce Communism and the Soviet Union in order to assume a place in the mainstream, Robeson adamantly declined.

Final years
After Essie, who had been his spokesperson to the media, died in December 1965, Robeson moved in with his son's family in New York City. He was rarely seen strolling near his Harlem apartment on Jumel Place, and his son responded to press inquiries that his "father's health does not permit him to perform, or answer questions."
In 1968, he settled at his sister's home in Philadelphia.

Numerous celebrations were held in honor of Robeson over the next several years, including at public arenas that had previously shunned him, but he saw few visitors aside from close friends and gave few statements apart from messages to support current civil rights and international movements, feeling that his record "spoke for itself".

At a Carnegie Hall tribute to mark his 75th birthday in 1973, he was unable to attend, but a taped message from him was played that said: "Though I have not been able to be active for several years, I want you to know that I am the same Paul, dedicated as ever to the worldwide cause of humanity for freedom, peace and brotherhood."

1976: Death, funeral, and public response
On January 23, 1976, following complications of a stroke, Robeson died in Philadelphia at the age of 77. He lay in state in Harlem and his funeral was held at his brother Ben's former parish, Mother Zion AME Zion Church, where Bishop J. Clinton Hoggard performed the eulogy. His 12 pall bearers included Harry Belafonte and Fritz Pollard. He was interred in the Ferncliff Cemetery in Hartsdale, New York.

Biographer Martin Duberman said of news media notices upon Robeson's death:the "white [American] press ... ignored the continuing inability of white America to tolerate a black maverick who refused to bend, ... downplayed the racist component central to his persecution" [during his life, as they] "gingerly" [paid him] "respect and tipped their hat to him as a ‘great American’," while the black American press, "which had never, overall, been as hostile to Robeson" [as the white American press had,] opined that his life " ‘... would always be a challenge to white and Black America.’"

Legacy and honors

Early in his life, Robeson was one of the most influential participants in the Harlem Renaissance. His achievements in sport and culture were all the more impressive given the barriers of racism he had to surmount. Robeson brought Negro spirituals into the American mainstream. He was among the first artists to refuse to perform to segregated audiences. Historian Penny Von Eschen wrote: "After McCarthyism, [Robeson's stand] on anti-colonialism in the 1940s would never again have a voice in American politics, but the [African independence movements] of the late 1950s and 1960s would vindicate his anti-colonial [agenda]."

In 1945, he received the Spingarn medal from the NAACP. Several public and private establishments he was associated with have been landmarked, or named after him. His efforts to end Apartheid in South Africa were posthumously rewarded in 1978 by the United Nations General Assembly.  Paul Robeson: Tribute to an Artist won an Academy Award for best short documentary in 1980. In 1995, he was named to the College Football Hall of Fame. In the centenary of his birth, which was commemorated around the world, he was awarded a Lifetime Achievement Grammy Award, as well as a star on the Hollywood Walk of Fame. Robeson is also a member of the American Theater Hall of Fame.

, the run of Othello starring Robeson was the longest-running production of a Shakespeare play ever staged on Broadway. He received a Donaldson Award for his performance. His Othello was characterised by Michael A. Morrison in 2011 as a high point in Shakespearean theatre in the 20th century. In 1930, while performing Othello in London, Robeson was painted by the British artist Glyn Philpot; this portrait was sold in 1944 under the title Head of a Negro and thereafter thought lost, but was rediscovered by Simon Martin, the director of the Pallant House Gallery, for an exhibition held there in 2022.

Robeson archives exist at the Academy of Arts; Howard University, and the Schomburg Center for Research in Black Culture. In 2010, Susan Robeson launched a project at Swansea University, supported the Welsh Assembly, to create an online learning resource in her grandfather's memory.

In 1976, the apartment building on Edgecombe Avenue in the Washington Heights section of Manhattan where Robeson lived during the early 1940s was officially renamed the Paul Robeson Residence, and declared a National Historic Landmark. In 1993, the building was designated a New York City landmark as well.  Edgecombe Avenue itself was later co-named Paul Robeson Boulevard.

In 1978, TASS announced that the Latvian Shipping Company had named one of its new 40,000-ton tankers Paul Robeson in honor of the singer. TASS said the ship's crew established a Robeson museum aboard the tanker. After Robeson's death, a street in the Prenzlauer Berg district of East Berlin was renamed Paul-Robeson-Straße, and the street name remains in reunified Berlin. An East German stamp featuring Robeson's face was issued with the text "For Peace Against Racism, Paul Robeson 1898–1976."

In 2001, (Here I Stand) In the Spirit of Paul Robeson, a public artwork by American artist Allen Uzikee Nelson, was dedicated in the Petworth neighborhood in Washington, D.C.

In 2002, a blue plaque was unveiled by English Heritage on the house in Hampstead where Robeson lived in 1929–30. On May 18, 2002, a memorial concert celebrating the 50th anniversary of Robeson's concert across the Canadian border took place on the same spot at Peace Park in Vancouver.

In 2004, the U.S. Postal Service issued a 37-cent stamp honoring Robeson. In 2006, a plaque was unveiled in his honor at SOAS University of London. In 2007, the Criterion Collection, a company that specializes in releasing special-edition versions of classic and contemporary films, released a DVD boxed set of Robeson films. In 2009, Robeson was inducted into the New Jersey Hall of Fame.

The main campus library at Rutgers University-Camden is named after Robeson, as is the campus center at Rutgers University-Newark. The Paul Robeson Cultural Center is on the campus of Rutgers University-New Brunswick.

In 1972, Penn State established a formal cultural center on the University Park campus. Students and staff chose to name the center for Robeson. A street in Princeton, New Jersey is named after him. In addition, the block of Davenport Street in Somerville, New Jersey, where St. Thomas AME Zion Church still stands is called Paul Robeson Boulevard. In West Philadelphia, the Paul Robeson High School is named after him. To celebrate the 100th anniversary of Robeson's graduation, Rutgers University named an open-air plaza after him on Friday, April 12, 2019. The plaza, next to the Voorhees Mall on the College Avenue campus at Rutgers–New Brunswick, features eight black granite panels with details of Robeson's life.

On March 6, 2019, the city council of New Brunswick, New Jersey approved the renaming of Commercial Avenue to Paul Robeson Boulevard.

A dark red heirloom tomato from the Soviet Union was given the name Paul Robeson.

In popular culture
In 1949, some Chinese editors published children cartoons presenting him as an artistic and revolutionary hero.
In 1954, the Kurdish poet Abdulla Goran wrote the poem  ("A Call for Paul Robeson"). In the same year, another Kurdish poet, Cegerxwîn, also wrote a poem about him,  ("Comrade Paul Robeson"), which was put to music by singer Şivan Perwer in 1976.

Black 47's 1989 album Home of the Brave includes the song "Paul Robeson (Born to Be Free)", which features spoken quotes of Robeson as part of the song. These quotes are drawn from Robeson's testimony before the House Un-American Activities Committee in June 1956. In 2001, Welsh rock band Manic Street Preachers released a song titled "Let Robeson Sing" as a tribute to Robeson, which reached number 19 on the UK singles chart.

In January 1978, James Earl Jones performed the one-man show Paul Robeson, written by Phillip Hayes Dean, on Broadway. This stage drama was made into a TV movie in 1979, starring Jones and directed by Lloyd Richards. At the 2007 Edinburgh Festival Fringe, British-Nigerian actor Tayo Aluko, himself a baritone soloist, premiered his one-man show, Call Mr. Robeson: A Life with Songs, which has since toured various countries.

World Inferno Friendship Society had a semi biographical song about Paul Robsons' life on their 2006 album Red Eyed Soul.

Tom Rob Smith's novel Agent 6 (2012) includes the character Jesse Austin, "a black singer, political activist and communist sympathizer modeled after real-life actor/activist Paul Robeson."  Robeson also appears in short fiction published in the online literary magazines the Maple Tree Literary Supplement and Every Day Fiction.

Film director Steve McQueen's video work End Credits (2012–ongoing), shown at the Whitney, the Tate Modern, the Art Institute of Chicago, and the Pérez Art Museum, reproduces Robeson's declassified, although still heavily redacted, FBI files.

On September 7, 2019, Crossroads Theatre Company performed Phillip Hayes Dean's play Paul Robeson in the inaugural performance of the New Brunswick Performing Arts Center.

Robeson was widely popular among Indian intellectuals and artists. Noted Indian singer-songwriter, Dr. Bhupen Hazarika met Robeson in 1949, befriended him and participated in civil rights activities. Hazarika based his iconic Assamese song "Bistirno Parore" ("Of the wide shores") on Robeson's "Ol' Man River", later translated into Bengali, Hindi, Nepali and Sanskrit. Singer-songwriter Hemanga Biswas sang the Bengali ballad "Negro bhai amar Paul Robeson" ("Our Negro brother Paul Robeson"). There were nation-wide celebrations in India on Robeson's 60th birthday in 1958, with the then prime minister Jawaharlal Nehru saying "This occasion deserves celebration…because Paul Robeson is one of the greatest artistes of our generation".

Filmography

 Body and Soul (1925)
 Camille (1926)
 Borderline (1930)
 The Emperor Jones (1933)
 Sanders of the River (1935)
 Show Boat (1936)
 Song of Freedom (1936)
 Big Fella (1937)
 My Song Goes Forth (1937)
 King Solomon's Mines (1937)
 Jericho/Dark Sands (1937)
 The Proud Valley (1940)
 Native Land (1942)
 Tales of Manhattan (1942)
 The Song of the Rivers (1954)

Discography 
Paul Robeson had an extensive recording career; discogs.com lists some 66 albums and 195 singles.

See also
 Freedom (American newspaper)

References

Primary materials
 .
 
 Robeson, Paul Leroy (1919-06-10). "The New Idealism". The Targum 50, 1918–1919: 570–71.

Biographies
 
 
 
 
 
 Goodman, Jordan (2013). Paul Robeson: A Watched Man. Verso Books.

Secondary materials

Film biographies and documentaries
 The Tallest Tree in Our Forest (1977) 
 Paul Robeson: Tribute to an Artist (1979)  
 Paul Robeson – James Earl Jones One Man Show (1979 TV movie) 
 Paul Robeson: I'm a Negro, I'm an American  (1989, DEFA, East Germany, dir. Kurt Tetzlaff) – 
 Paul Robeson: Speak of Me as I Am (1998)
 His name was Robeson (1998)  Interview by director Nikolay Milovidov with Paul Robson Jr. who shares his memories about a conversation Robson had in 1949 in a room at the Moscow Hotel with the Jewish poet Itzik Feffer, who told Robeson the circumstances of Solomon Mikhoels' death.
 Paul Robeson: Here I Stand (1999) PBS American Masters, directed by St. Clair Bourne 
 Paul Robeson: Portraits of an Artist (2007) Irvington: Criterion Collection. .

Further reading
 Callow, Simon, "The Emperor Robeson" (review of Gerald Horne, Paul Robeson:  The Artist as Revolutionary, Pluto, 250 pp.; and Jeff Sparrow, No Way But This:  In Search of Paul Robeson, Scribe, 292 pp.), The New York Review of Books, vol. LXV, no. 2 (February 8, 2018), pp. 8, 10–11.

External links

 
 Paul Robeson's FBI records

Associated institutions
 Paul Robeson House
 Paul Robeson Charter School
 Paul Robeson Performing Arts Company

Paul Robeson archives
 Marxists.org
 National Archives
 Library of Congress

 
1898 births
1976 deaths
African-American activists
20th-century American male actors
20th-century American singers
20th-century American male singers
Activists for African-American civil rights
Activists from New Jersey
African-American basketball players
African-American lawyers
African-American male actors
African-American male singers
African-American players of American football
Akron Pros players
All-American college football players
Alumni of SOAS University of London
American anti-fascists
American anti-lynching activists
American bass-baritones
American basses
American civil rights activists
American expatriates in the United Kingdom
American folk singers
American football ends
American humanitarians
American male film actors
American men's basketball players
American people of Igbo descent
American people who self-identify as being of Native American descent
American socialists
Basketball players from New Jersey
Burials at Ferncliff Cemetery
Civil rights movement
Columbia Law School alumni
Donaldson Award winners
Grammy Lifetime Achievement Award winners
Harlem Renaissance
Lincoln Lions football coaches
Male actors from New Jersey
Milwaukee Badgers players
New York (state) lawyers
Paul Robeson family
People from Princeton, New Jersey
Sportspeople from Somerville, New Jersey
People from Westfield, New Jersey
Players of American football from New Jersey
Progressive Party (United States, 1948) politicians
Rutgers Scarlet Knights football players
Rutgers Scarlet Knights men's basketball players
Somerville High School (New Jersey) alumni
Spingarn Medal winners
Stalin Peace Prize recipients
Musicians from Somerville, New Jersey
Male actors from Somerville, New Jersey